Koombooloomba is a rural locality in the Tablelands Region, Queensland, Australia. In the  Koombooloomba had a population of 0 people.

The locality was used during the construction of the Kareeya Hydro Power Station.

Geography
There is a hydro-electric Koombooloomba Dam nearby. The Koombooloomba dam acts as a water reservoir which supplies water to the Tully River downstream and the Kareeya Hydro Power Station. The Tully River flows from nearby Tully into the ocean.

History
The village of Koombooloomba was built to accommodate the workers on the Koombooloomba Dam. The timber for the village was cut from trees that would be submerged by the dam.

Koombooloomba State School opened on 19 February 1953 and closed in 1963.

Koombooloomba Post Office opened about December 1952 and closed about 1963.

In the  Koombooloomba had a population of 0 people.

References

Towns in Queensland
Populated places in Far North Queensland
Tablelands Region
Localities in Queensland